Kristiina Halttu (born 7 June 1963 in Kuivaniemi, Finland) is a Finnish actress.
 
Halttu began her career in acting in 1991 appearing recently in the 2006 film Saippuaprinssi  in which she worked with actors such as Mikko Leppilampi, Pamela Tola and Teijo Eloranta.

Halttu is the Finnish voice actor of Mrs Fillyjonk in the Finnish-British animated television family drama Moominvalley (2019–).
She played Taina Henttunen in the Finnish TV series Bordertown.

Filmography

References

External links
 

1963 births
Living people
People from Ii
Finnish television actresses
Finnish film actresses
20th-century Finnish actresses
21st-century Finnish actresses